Category I can refer to:
 Category I New Testament manuscripts - Alexandrian
 Category-I Miniratna public sector undertakings (India)
 Category I measurement - performed on circuits not directly connected to MAINS
 Category I (a/b) protected areas (IUCN) - Strict Nature Reserve (Ia)/Wilderness Area (Ib)

See also 
 Class I (disambiguation) - class/category equivalence (for labeling)
 Type 1 (disambiguation) - type/category equivalence (for labeling)
 Group 1 (disambiguation) - group/category equivalence (for labeling)
 Category 1 (disambiguation) - Roman/Arabic numbering equivalence